The ReVe Festival: Day 1 (occasionally referred as Day 1) is the third special extended play and the  by South Korean girl group Red Velvet. Released on June 19, 2019, through SM Entertainment, the extended play served as the first installation of the group's The ReVe Festival trilogy, which was later followed by Day 2 and Finale. An electro-pop and dance-pop record, the EP contains six tracks that sees the group exploring new genres. Its production was handled by various songwriters and production teams, including Caesar & Loui, Ollipop, Moonshine, Trinity Music, Ylva Dimberg, Cazzi Opeia, Ryan S. Jhun, amongst others.

Upon its release, Day 1 received mixed to positive reviews from critics, who were polarized over its experimental and genre-hopping nature. It was commercially successful domestically, becoming their ninth chart-topper on the Gaon Album Chart. Its lead single, "Zimzalabim", additionally peaked at number 11 and 10 on the Gaon Digital Chart and World Digital Songs charts, respectively. To promote the release, Red Velvet embarked on their third concert tour, titled La Rouge, and included songs from the EP on its setlist.

Background and release
Following the release of their second Japanese extended play Sappy on May 29, 2019, SM Entertainment shared the first preview of The ReVe Festival through social media platforms on June 4, 2019, along with the release announcement for the trilogy within 2019. The name ReVe was stemmed from the abbreviation of Red Velvet, also meaning "dream" or "fantasy" in French. It was also named after the fictional robotic character that served as a mascot during the group's second concert tour, titled Redmare. In addition, the label also revealed that The character also appeared in promotional material for the trilogy as well.<ref>{{cite web|url=https://smglobalshop.com/products/pre-order-red-velvet-mini-album-the-reve-festival-day-1-day-1-ver|title=Pre-Order – Red Velvet Mini Album The ReVe Festival' Day 1' (Day 1 V – SM Global Shop)|website=smglobalshop.com|accessdate=June 10, 2019}}</ref> The lead single, "Zimzalabim", has additionally been described as an "addictive electro pop with rhythmic drums and cool melodies".

Promotion
The EP was announced through social media on June 4, 2019, with a teaser image of a gold coin featuring the band members' names, the title and date on it. On June 10, the band confirmed the lead single would be "Zimzalabim" through their social media.

A special music video for "Milkshake" was uploaded on August 1, 2019, to coincide with the group's fifth anniversary. The video was first shown at the group's anniversary fan-meeting event, 'inteRView vol.5'.

Reception
Commercially, the CD version of the EP debuted atop the Gaon Weekly Album Chart, and sold 156,993 copies by the end of 2019 in South Korea, placing thirty-seventh for the year.  While the kihno version of the EP placing forty-ninth in the monthly chart with 3,611 copies. It was the group's eleventh top-ten entry on the Billboard World Albums chart, their third appearance on the component UK Digital Albums chart, and their fourth top-twenty entry on the Oricon Albums Chart.The ReVe Festival: Day 1 received an Album Bonsang nomination at the 34th Golden Disc Awards. The track "Sunny Side Up" was additionally ranked number 10 in MTV's list of 20 "Best K-pop B-sides of 2019".

Track listing

Charts

Weekly charts

Year-end charts
 

Certifications

Release history

See also
 The ReVe Festival: Day 2 The ReVe Festival: Finale The ReVe Festival 2022 - Feel My Rhythm''

References

2019 EPs
Red Velvet (group) EPs
IRiver EPs